Sharurah Domestic Airport is an airport serving Sharurah, a town in Najran Province, Saudi Arabia. The airport was established in 1972.

Facilities

Airlines and destinations

These are the following Airlines that offering scheduled passenger service:

See also 

 List of airports in Saudi Arabia
 Saudia
 Najran Province

References

External links
 
 
 

Airports in Saudi Arabia
Sharurah
1972 establishments in Saudi Arabia
Airports established in 1972